Metawar is the third studio album by the American industrial metal band 3Teeth. It was released on July 5, 2019 as the band's first album on their new label, Century Media Records.

Release and promotion
Initial work on the album began in early 2018 following extensive touring in support of <shutdown.exe>. Sean Beavan returned to work with the band once again, taking on mixing and production duties for the new album. The band announced the completion of the album on December 22, 2018 via their official Instagram page and a tentative release window of Spring 2019 was set.  
  
The first single, "American Landfill", was released worldwide on April 5, 2019 alongside the official announcement of the July 5 global release date. Alongside the new album announcement, the band also announced a summer tour in support of Ministry. Frontman Mincolla described the new album as focusing on the idea of world versus world. "Thematically it's centered largely around concepts of accelerationism and the political heresy of inviting the end as an opportunity as a fresh start", Mincolla said.

The music video for "American Landfill" debuted on April 15, 2019. The video was directed by Matthew Charles Santoro, longtime friend of Alexis Mincolla and Hollywood director and visual effects artist whose credits include X-Men Origins: Wolverine and 300.

"Exit" was released as the second single with an accompanying music video on April 23. "The song hinges on a conceptual ultimatum and the human urge towards self-destruction as a form of liberation," Mincolla said. The video, which features performance artist Jeanelle Mastema suspended from hooks, was described as "gruesome" and "NSFW" and was inspired by concepts featured in Albert O. Hirschman's 1970 treatise Exit, Voice, and Loyalty.

"Exit" was premiered alongside a North American tour announcement featuring Author & Punisher and GOST as support.

The third single supporting the album, Affluenza, was released on May 31, 2019. Mincolla describes Affluenza as being "the all-consuming epidemic of our time. It's a socially transmitted disease that infects via the prosthetic digital nervous system when exposed to the conspicuous consumption based infotoxins emitted from Kim Kardashian's ass." An official lyric music video was released for the single as well.   
  
The fourth single promoting the album, President X, was released on June 14, 2019. The single was accompanied by a music video featuring Mincolla as a neo-fascist lizard-man president in "band's most outwardly political song to date."

The fifth single released was the band's cover of "Pumped Up Kicks" by Foster the People which was released on June 28, 2019. A fifth music video was released alongside the single as well. On why the band decided to do a cover song, Mincolla said "Industrial bands have a long history of subverting popular culture songs...We’ve just always been a fan of this sort of thing and felt it would be a good time to take an iconic song of the late 2000s and give it some unexpected 2019 industrial darkness."

On January 17, 2020, Altær was released as the album's sixth single along with a music video.

While touring in support of Metawar, the band recorded one original track and two cover songs for the film Guns Akimbo. Their cover of You Spin Me Round (Like a Record) by Dead or Alive (band) was featured in the film's trailer, and it was later announced that the second cover song would be The Ballroom Blitz originally recorded by The Sweet.

Critical reception

Metawar received generally positive reviews from critics. At Metacritic, which assigns a normalized rating out of 100 to reviews from mainstream critics, the album has an average score of 61 out of 100, which indicates "Generally favorable reviews" based on 4 reviews. Loudwire named it one of the 50 best metal albums of 2019.

Charts

Following its release, Metawar became the band's most commercially successful album, debuting at #23 on Billboard and at #28 on the iTunes Top Albums chart  as well as the #1 album on the iTunes Metal charts. The album also debuted at #82 on Billboard's Top Album Sales chart for the week of July 20, 2019 and at #3 on Billboard's Heatseekers Albums for the same week. With the release of Metawar, 3teeth themselves charted at #25 on Billboard's Emerging Artists chart.

Track listing

Notes
 All tracks are stylized in all caps.
 "Exit" is stylized as "EXXXIT".

Personnel
3Teeth
 Alexis Mincolla – vocals, lyrics
 Chase Brawner – guitars
 Xavier Swafford – keyboards, synthesizers
 Andrew Means – bass, modular synthesizers
 Justin Hanson – drums

Production
Sean Beavan – programming, engineering, and mixing
Juliette Beaven – additional vocals
 Howie Weinberg – mastering
Mike Glitter – A&R
Don Robertson – A&R

Visual personnel
 Alexis Mincolla – art direction
 Marcel Lagerquist – graphic design
 Mihail Aleksandrovich – 3D modeling
 Sqeuoia Emmanuelle – photography

References

2019 albums
3Teeth albums
Century Media Records albums
Albums produced by Sean Beavan